Uruca District may refer to:

 Uruca District, San José, in San José Canton, San José Province, Costa Rica
 Uruca District, Santa Ana, in Santa Ana Canton, San José Province, Costa Rica

District name disambiguation pages